Pierre Marie Édouard Lamy de la Chapelle (1804, Limoges – 23 September 1886) was a French botanist.

Lamy de la Chapelle is known for botanical investigations of Haute-Vienne. In his research he collaborated with botanist Louis Jules Ernest Malinvaud (1836–1913).

In 1866 he became a member of the "Société botanique de France". His herbarium, the Herbier Pierre Marie Edouard Lamy de la Chapelle is housed at the Institut des Herbiers Universitaires in Clermont-Ferrand.

The moss species, Didymodon lamyanus and Trichostomum lamyanum are named after him.

Writings 
 Mousses et hépatiques du département de la Haute-Vienne, 1875 - Mosses and hepatics of the department of Haute-Vienne.
 Mousses et hépatiques du Mont-Dore, 1875 - Mosses and hepatics of Mont-Dore.
 Mousses et hépatiques du Mont-Dore et de la Haute-Vienne, 1878 - Mosses and hepatics of Mont-Dore and in Haute-Vienne.
 Invasion dans la Haute-Vienne de la maladie de la vigne dite le Mildiou, 1882 - treatise on mildew affecting vines in Haute-Vienne.

References 

1804 births
1886 deaths
19th-century French botanists
Bryologists
People from Limoges